The Ambassador of the United Kingdom to Switzerland is the United Kingdom's foremost diplomatic representative to the Swiss Confederation, and head of the UK's diplomatic mission in Switzerland. The formal title of the post is His [Britannic] Majesty's Ambassador to the Swiss Confederation but it is usually called, even officially, simply His [Britannic] Majesty's Ambassador to Switzerland.

The British Ambassador to Switzerland is also non-resident Ambassador to the Principality of Liechtenstein.

List of heads of mission

Envoy Extraordinary
1689–1692: Thomas Coxe
1689–1702: Philibert de Hervart, baron van Hüningen (to the Republic of Geneva only 1689–1692)
1702–1705: William Aglionby extraordinary envoy
1705–1714: Abraham Stanyan (also to the Grisons 1707–1714)
1710 and 1715–1717: James Dayrolle Resident at Geneva
1716–1722: Francis Manning (also Secretary to the Grisons at Coire 1709–1713)

Minister Plenipotentiary to the Swiss Cantons
1717–1762: Armand Louis de St. George, Comte de Marsay Minster at Geneva 1717-34; Minister Resident to the Helvetic Republic and the Grisons Leagues 1734–1739; Minster at Geneva 1739–1762
1738–1743: Sir Luke Schaub (a diplomat)
1743–1749: John Burnaby Minister
1743–1750: Jerome de Salis Envoy Extraordinary to the Grisons Leagues
1750–1762: Arthur Villettes Minister
1762–1765: Robert Colebrooke Minister
1763–1765: James, Count of Pictet Minister to the Republic of Geneva
1765–1783: William Norton (but absent 1769–1776)
1769–1776: Jean Gabriel Catt Chargé d'Affaires
 1772–1774: Isaac Pictet Chargé d'Affaires at Geneva
 1777–1792: Louis Braun Chargé d'Affaires
1792–1795: Lord Robert Stephen FitzGerald
1795–1797: William Wickham also Special Mission 1794–1795
1797: James Talbot Chargé d'Affaires
1797–1814: No diplomatic relations

Envoy Extraordinary and Minister Plenipotentiary to the Confederated Swiss Cantons
1814–1820: Stratford Canning
1820–1822: William Cromwell Disbrowe Chargé d'Affaires
1822–1823: Henry Watkin Williams-Wynn

Minister Plenipotentiary to the Confederated States of the Swiss Cantons
1823–1825: Charles Richard Vaughan
1825–1832: Hon. Algernon Percy
1832–1847: David Richard Morier
1847: Gilbert Elliot-Murray-Kynynmound, 2nd Earl of Minto Special Mission
1847–1848: Sir Stratford CanningSpecial Mission
1848–1849: Henry Wellesley, 1st Baron Cowley

Minister Plenipotentiary to the Swiss Confederation
1849–1851: Sir Edmund Lyons, 1st Bt
1851–1852: Arthur Charles Magenis
1852–1853: Andrew Buchanan
1853–1854: Hon. Charles Murray
1854–1858: George John Robert Gordon
1858–1867: Hon. Edward Harris

Envoy Extraordinary and Minister Plenipotentiary to the Swiss Confederation
1867–1868: John Lumley-Savile
1868–1874: Alfred Guthrie Graham Bonar

Resident Minister to the Swiss Confederation
1874–1878: Edwin Corbett
1878–1879: Sir Horace Rumbold, 8th Bt
1879–1881: Hon. Hussey Crespigny Vivian

Envoy Extraordinary and Minister Plenipotentiary to the Swiss Confederation
Mar – Jul 1881: Hon. Hussey Vivian
1881–1888: Francis Adams
1888–1893: Charles Scott
1893–1901: Frederick St John
1901–1905: Sir Conyngham Greene
1905–1909: Sir George Bonham, 2nd Baronet
1909–1911: Henry Bax-Ironside
1911–1913: Esme Howard
1913–1916: Evelyn Grant Duff
1916–1919: Sir Horace Rumbold, 9th Baronet
1919–1922: Hon. Odo Russell
1922–1924: Sir Milne Cheetham
1924–1928: Rowland Sperling
1928–1931: Sir Claud Russell
1931–1935: Sir Howard Kennard
1935–1940: Sir George Warner
1940–1942: David Kelly
1942–1946: Sir Clifford Norton
1946–1950: Thomas Snow
1950–1953: Sir Patrick Scrivener

Ambassador Extraordinary and Plenipotentiary to the Swiss Confederation
May–Dec 1953: Sir Patrick Scrivener
1953–1958: Sir Lionel Lamb
1958–1960: Sir William Montagu-Pollock
1960–1964: Sir Paul Grey
1964–1968: Sir Robert Isaacson
1968–1970: Henry Hohler
1970–1973: Eric Midgley
1973–1976: Sir John Wraight
1976–1980: Sir Alan Rothnie
1980–1982: Sir Sydney Giffard
1982–1984: John Powell-Jones
1984–1988: John Rich
1988–1992: Christopher Long
1992–1997: David Beattie
1997–2001: Christopher Hulse
2001–2004: Basil Eastwood
2004–2008: Simon Featherstone
2008-2008: John Nichols
2009–2013: Sarah Gillett
2014–2017: David Moran

2017–2023: Jane Owen
2023–: James Squire

External links

References

Switzerland
United Kingdom